Karl Adam "Bud" Anderson  (born May 27, 1956) is an American former professional relief pitcher in Major League Baseball. 

Anderson attended Rutgers University where he played baseball and football for the Scarlet Knights. He was drafted by the Seattle Mariners in the third round of the 1977 amateur draft out of Rutgers. Anderson spent three seasons in the Seattle Mariners organization. In 1977, he played for the Bellingham Mariners, going 5–3 in 10 starts. In 1978, he pitched for the Stockton Mariners and went 12–8. In 1979, he spent most of the season with the Spokane Indians, and had a 2–13 record.

The Seattle Mariners traded Anderson to the Cleveland Indians on March 29, 1980, to complete an earlier trade. He made his major league debut on June 11, 1982, with the Indians. On that day, Anderson pitched three scoreless innings in relief. Despite having a 3.35 earned run average, Anderson posted a win–loss record of 3–4. Anderson's team went on to finish tied for sixth in their division. In 1983, Anderson had a 4.08 earned run average. On the day of his final major league appearance, October 2, he pitched three innings and allowed three earned runs.

At the time of his retirement Anderson had a 4–10 record, a 3.68 ERA, 62 walks, and 76 strikeouts.

References

External links

1956 births
Living people
Cleveland Indians players
Baseball players from New York (state)
Major League Baseball pitchers
Rutgers Scarlet Knights baseball players
Bellingham Mariners players
Stockton Mariners players
San Jose Missions players
Chattanooga Lookouts players
Charleston Charlies players
Maine Guides players
Tidewater Tides players
Fort Myers Sun Sox players
People from Westbury, New York
Rutgers Scarlet Knights football players
Sportspeople from Nassau County, New York